VSX may refer to:

 Visual Studio Extensibility, a feature of Microsoft's Visual Studio
 Power VSX (Vector Scalar Extension), SIMD instructions
 VSX, a file format of Microsoft Visio
 International Variable Star Index